Deo Kasenyenda Sanga (born 1 January 1956) is a Tanzanian CCM politician and Member of Parliament for Njombe North constituency since 2010.

References

1956 births
Living people
Chama Cha Mapinduzi MPs
Tanzanian MPs 2010–2015